Zhang Jing (born 16 June 1996) is a Chinese water polo. 

She was part of the Chinese team at the  2015 World Aquatics Championships, 2016 Summer Olympics and the 2020 Summer Olympics.

See also
 China at the 2015 World Aquatics Championships

References

External links

Chinese female water polo players
Living people
1996 births
Water polo players at the 2016 Summer Olympics
Water polo players at the 2020 Summer Olympics
Olympic water polo players of China
Asian Games medalists in water polo
Water polo players at the 2018 Asian Games
Asian Games gold medalists for China
Medalists at the 2018 Asian Games
21st-century Chinese women